is a professional Go player.

Biography
Yoda is a student of Takeo Ando. He has won 35 titles so far in his career, the seventh highest in Japan. He became a professional in 1980, and reached 9 dan in 1993. In 2006, he was the heart of the Japanese team in international tournaments, steering them to a win over Team Korea in the 7th Nongshim Cup.

In June 2017, Yoda scored his 1,100th win as a pro. He has 572 losses, two jigos, and two no-results. He is the 12th Nihon Ki-in player to reach 1,100 victories. At 51 years four months, he is the third youngest, and, at 37 years two months, the 4th quickest to do so.

Titles and runners-up 
Ranks #8-t in the total number of titles in Japan.

Appearance in Fiction 
The climactic go game played between the fictional players Fujiwara-no-Sai and Toya Meijin in the anime and manga series Hikaru no Go was in fact a real 1997 game between Norimoto Yoda and Rin Kaiho. Yoda played the winning white side attributed to Sai.

References

External links
GoBase Profile
Nihon Ki-in Profile

1966 births
Japanese Go players
Living people
Sportspeople from Hokkaido
People from Iwamizawa, Hokkaido
People from Tokyo